Caledonia's Hardy Sons is the second album by Silly Wizard originally released in the U.K. on Highway Records in 1978, and in the U.S. in 1980 on the Shanachie label.

Track listing
"Mo Chuachag Laghach (My Kindly Sweetheart)" (02:26)
"The Isla Waters" (03:50)
"The Twa Brithers" (06:15)
"The Auld Pipe Reel/The Brolum" (03:38)
"Glasgow Peggy" (03:21)
"Monymusk Lads" (03:32)
"The Ferryland Sealer" (03:24)
"Fhear A Bhata (The Boatman)" (04:38)
"Jack Cunningham's Farewell to Benbecula/Sweet Molly" (04:34)
"Broom O' the Cowdenknowes" (05:20)

Personnel
Phil Cunningham - Accordion, whistle, synthesizer, string synthesizer, harmonium, vocals
Johnny Cunningham - Fiddle, viola, bouzouki, mandolin, mandola, vocals
Martin Hadden - Bass, harmonium, vocals
Gordon Jones - Guitar, bodhran, bouzouki, mandola, vocals (Lead vocals on "Ferryland Sealer")
Andy M. Stewart - Vocals, tenor banjo, mandolin, mandola
Bob Thomas - Guitar, mandola

References

1978 albums
Silly Wizard albums
Shanachie Records albums